Bora Muzhaqi (born 11 March 1990) is an Albanian politician. She is currently serving as the Minister of State for Youth in the Albanian government. She was appointed Minister of Youth on 10 September 2021. Muzhaqi graduated with a degree in economics in 2012 from the London School of Economics and Political Science in London, and then went on to study for a master's degree, also in London, at HULT International Business School, in the field of International Business.

References 

Living people
1990 births
People from Elbasan
21st-century Albanian politicians
Government ministers of Albania
21st-century Albanian women politicians
Women government ministers of Albania
Alumni of the London School of Economics
Hult International Business School alumni
Socialist Party of Albania politicians